My Hindu Friend is a 2015 Brazilian drama film, directed and written by Hector Babenco, starring Willem Dafoe, Maria Fernanda Cândido, Bárbara Paz, Selton Mello and Reynaldo Gianecchini.

It was released on 3 March 2016.

Plot 
Diego (Willem Dafoe) is a film director who is diagnosed with cancer and, while hospitalized, meets and befriends a Hindu 8-year-old boy who is also a patient at the hospital.

Cast 
Willem Dafoe as Diego Fairman
Maria Fernanda Cândido as Livia Monteiro Bueno
Reynaldo Gianecchini as Ricardo Steen
Selton Mello as Common Man
Bárbara Paz as Sofia Guerra
Guilherme Weber as Antonio Fairman
Dan Stulbach as Marcos
Gilda Nomacce as Antonio's Wife
Tuna Dwek as Gabi
Tania Khalill as Rosemary
Maitê Proença as Debora
Dalton Vigh as Dr. Morris
Supla as Paiva
Ary Fontoura as Dudu
Rio Adlakha as Hindu Friend
Soren Hellerup as Herbert Spencer

Reception

References

External links
 
 

2015 films
2010s Portuguese-language films
2015 drama films
Brazilian drama films
Films about cancer
Films set in hospitals
Brazilian independent films
Films set in São Paulo
Films directed by Héctor Babenco
Films scored by Zbigniew Preisner
2015 independent films
2010s English-language films
2015 multilingual films
Brazilian multilingual films